Downwind is the third album by Pierre Moerlen's Gong, although it was the first to be released under that name, the previous two having been released as Gong albums for contractual reasons. It was released in February 1979.

Featuring a mostly instrumental jazz-driven sound, notable for the prominent use of vibraphone, it has little to do with the psychedelic space rock of Daevid Allen's Gong, even though the two bands share a common history.

Downwind marks a slight departure from the formula of the previous de facto Pierre Moerlen's Gong's albums, Gazeuse! and Expresso II. "Aeroplane" and "What You Know" are short-form pop songs with vocals, the only time that Moerlen would attempt this. The lengthy title track displays an emerging progressive rock influence and features lead guitar by Mike Oldfield (for whom Moerlen was also playing at the time), keyboards by Steve Winwood and saxophone by ex-Gong member Didier Malherbe. For the first time, keyboards augment or replace mallet percussion on some tracks.

Track listing

Personnel
Pierre Moerlen's Gong
Pierre Moerlen – drums, vibraphone, marimba, concert toms, timpani, organ, synthesizer, electric piano, assorted percussion, lead vocals
Benoît Moerlen – vibraphone
Hansford Rowe – bass
François Causse – percussion
Ross Record – guitar, vocals
Former Pierre Moerlen's Gong
Didier Malherbe – saxophone (3)
Additional personnel
Didier Lockwood – violin (2,6,7)
Mike Oldfield – guitar, solina strings, bass, Irish drum (3)
Steve Winwood – synthesizer (3)
Terry Oldfield – flute (3)
Mick Taylor – guitar (5)

References

Macan, E. L., Macan, E. (1997). Rocking the Classics: English Progressive Rock and the Counterculture. Germany: Oxford University Press. p. 243

1979 albums
Gong (band) albums
Pierre Moerlen's Gong albums
Arista Records albums